The 2016 Greek Cup Final was the 72nd final of the Greek Football Cup. It took place on 17 May 2016 at Olympic Stadium, between Olympiacos and AEK Athens. It was Olympiacos' thirty ninth Greek Cup Final and second consecutive, in their 91 years of existence and AEK Athens' twenty first Greek Cup Final of their 92-year history. On 5 April 2016, FIFA Emergency Committee decided to provide the Greek authorities with a deadline to have the cancellation of the competition reversed before 15 April 2016 or the HFF would face an automatic suspension. The Greek authorities announced on deadline day that the Greek Football Cup will be resumed after an agreement reached with FIFA, UEFA and HFF. A new schedule with the remaining match was announced with the final being played on 7 May 2016, but the final was later postponed to 15 May 2016.  It was again postponed to 17 May 2016.

Venue

This was the twenty second Greek Cup Final held at the Athens Olympic Stadium, after the 1983, 1984, 1985, 1986, 1987, 1988, 1989, 1990, 1993, 1994, 1995, 1996, 1999, 2000, 2002, 2009, 2010, 2011, 2012, 2013, 2014 and 2015 finals.

The Athens Olympic Stadium was built in 1982 and renovated once in 2004. The stadium is used as a venue for AEK Athens and was used for Olympiacos, Panathinaikos and Greece in various occasions. Its current capacity is 69,618 and hosted 3 UEFA European Cup/Champions League Finals in 1983, 1994 and 2007, a UEFA Cup Winners' Cup Final in 1987, the 1991 Mediterranean Games and the 2004 Summer Olympics.

Background
Olympiacos had reached the Greek Cup Final thirty eight times, winning twenty seven of them. The last time that had played in a Final was in 2015, where they had won Skoda Xanthi by 3–1.

AEK Athens had reached the Greek Cup Final twenty times, winning thirteen of them. The last time that had played in a Final was in 2011, where they had won Atromitos by 3–0.

Route to the final

Match

Details

References

2016
Cup Final
Greek Cup Final 2016
Greek Cup Final 2016
Sports competitions in Athens
May 2016 sports events in Europe